Arthrophyllum is a defunct genus of plants in the family Araliaceae. It was recognized by most authors until 2010, when all of its 30 species were "sunk" into Polyscias subgenus Arthrophyllum.

Arthrophyllum is mostly a genus of shrubs and small to medium trees, but it contains a few large trees, and in New Caledonia, a few lianas, as well. The fruit is 1-seeded and the ovary is unilocular. The genus is indigenous to Indomalesia and islands of the southwestern Pacific.

The most widespread and variable of the species is Polyscias jackiana (formerly Arthrophyllum jackianum). Until 2003, it was usually treated as conspecific with Polyscias diversifolia. The New Guinea species Polyscias macranthum can occasionally become quite large and is locally used for lumber.

The four species from New Caledonia were once placed in a separate genus, Eremopanax, distinguished by seeds containing smooth endosperm, versus ruminate endosperm for Arthrophyllum. It was later determined that this character does not clearly distinguish the two genera, and they were united under Arthrophyllum by William Raymond Philipson in 1978, bringing the total number of species up to about 30. For Arthrophyllum in New Caledonia, the taxonomic history is complex, because the species are not clearly distinct, and their circumscription has varied greatly from one author to another.

According to Index Nominum Genericorum, no type species was ever designated for Arthrophyllum. When the former genus Arthrophyllum became part of Polyscias subgenus Arthrophyllum in 2010, Polyscias diversifolia was designated as the type for the subgenus. Polyscias subgenus Arthrophyllum consists of all of the 30 species from the former genus Arthrophyllum, all of the four species from the former genus Kissodendron, and four species already placed in Polyscias.

Species in Polyscias subgenus Arthrophyllum 
The following species list is for Polyscias subgenus Arthrophyllum, and is taken from Lowry and Plunkett (2010). For some of the species, the delimitation or the specific epithet is different from that of Frodin and Govaerts (2003). These changes are explained below. The list in the taxobox is for the former genus Arthrophyllum and is from Frodin and Govaerts (2003).

 Polyscias aherniana 
 Polyscias alternifolia 
 Polyscias angustifolia 
 Polyscias ashtonii 
 Polyscias australiana 
 Polyscias bellendenkerensis 
 Polyscias biforme 
 Polyscias bipinnata 
 Polyscias cenabrei 
 Polyscias collina 
 Polyscias disperma 
 Polyscias diversifolia 
 Polyscias elliptica 
 Polyscias engganoense 
 Polyscias havilandii 
 Polyscias jackiana 
 Polyscias kjellbergii 
 Polyscias lucens 
 Polyscias mackeei 
 Polyscias macranthum 
 Polyscias macrocarpa 
 Polyscias meliifolia 
 Polyscias montana 
 Polyscias otopyrena 
 Polyscias pacifica 
 Polyscias papyracea 
 Polyscias prolifera 
 Polyscias pulgarense 
 Polyscias revoluta 
 Polyscias royenii 
 Polyscias rubiginosa 
 Polyscias rufosepala 
 Polyscias schultzei 
 Polyscias stonei 
 Polyscias thailandica 
 Polyscias vieillardii 
 Polyscias willmottii 
 Polyscias zippeliana

History 
The genus Arthrophyllum was named by Carl Ludwig von Blume in 1826 in his classic :es:Bijdragen tot de flora van Nederlandsch Indië. The name is derived from the Greek arthron, "a joint" and phyllon, "a leaf".

In 1977, William R. Philipson transferred two Australian species, Polyscias bellendenkerensis and Polyscias willmottii into Polyscias from Pentapanax. He found the distinction between Arthrophyllum and Eremopanax to be artificial, and in 1978, he united the two genera under the name Arthrophyllum. In 1979, he covered Araliaceae for Flora Malesiana. In 1995, he covered Araliaceae, except Schefflera, for a flora of New Guinea. His treatment of Arthrophyllum was largely followed in a checklist and nomenclator for Araliaceae that was compiled by Frodin and Govaerts in 2003.

Frodin and Govaerts recognized 30 species in Arthrophyllum. They were not able to determine what Philipson had intended by the name Arthrophyllum maingayi, one of the 17 species that he described for Flora Malesiana. No known specimens, living or preserved, are known to match Philipson's description.

In 2010, a molecular phylogenetic study of the pinnate Araliaceae showed that they could not be divided into genera that could easily be distinguished morphologically. Uncertainties remain about the taxonomy of this group because of a large number of unpublished species and species of uncertain affinities that have never been sampled for DNA. For these reasons, all of the pinnate Araliaceae were assigned to Polyscias, thereby subsuming six genera (Arthrophyllum, Cuphocarpus, Gastonia, Reynoldsia, Munroidendron, and Tetraplasandra) into Polyscias and increasing the number of species in that genus from about 100 to 159.

Lowry and Plunkett (2010) divided the expanded Polyscias (Polyscias sensu lato) into 11 subgenera: Polyscias, Grotefendia, Maralia, Arthrophyllum, Cuphocarpus, Tetraplasandra, Eupteron, Sciadopanax, Tieghemopanax, Indokingia, and Palmervandenbroekia. All of these had been genus names at one time or another. Two of them are often misspelled as "Grotenfendia" and "Palmervandenbrockia". Spelling can be checked at International Plant Names Index, Index Nominum Genericorum, or Tropicos (See External links below).

Polyscias subgenus Arthrophyllum consists of 30 species from the former genus Arthrophyllum, combined with the four species that were in Kissodendron (Polyscias bellendenkerensis, P. bipinnata, P. australiana, and P. disperma), and four species that Frodin and Govaerts had placed in Polyscias (Polyscias royenii, P. schultzei, P. willmottii, and P. zippeliana). Thus Polyscias subgenus Arthrophyllum comprises 38 species.

The circumscription of Kissodendron and its division into species has varied considerably. Frodin and Govaerts (2003) recognized only three species: K. bellendenkeriensis, K. bipinnata, and K. australiana. Lowry and Plunkett (2010) recognized these three, but placed them in Polyscias and split P. australiana, recognizing P. disperma as a separate species. Philipson (1979) had included P. royenii, P. schultzei and P. zippeliana in his Polyscias section Kissodendron, but covered only the Malesian species.

Six species names in Arthrophyllum could not be transferred to Polyscias with the same specific epithet because those epithets were already occupied in Polyscias by the following species: Polyscias balansae (subgenus Tieghemopanax), Polyscias borneensis (subgenus Tetraplasandra), Polyscias crassa (subgenus Indokingia), Polyscias ferruginea (=Polyscias fulva) (subgenus Sciadopanax), Polyscias grandifolia (=Polyscias macgillivrayi) (subgenus Polyscias), and Polyscias javanica (subgenus Polyscias). Because of the existence of these names in Polyscias, Arthrophyllum borneense was transferred to Polyscias as Polyscias aherniana. Philipson had used the name Arthrophyllum ahernianum for this species. Arthrophyllum crassum was renamed as Polyscias revoluta. Arthrophyllum ferrugineum became Polyscias thailandica and  Arthrophyllum javanicum became Polyscias elliptica.

The taxonomic history of the New Caledonian members of Polyscias subgenus Arthrophyllum is complex. Ten valid species names and a nomen nudum have been published in Arthrophyllum for this group. Philipson recognized only three species, treating eight of the species names as synonyms for Arthrophyllum otopyrenum. Frodin and Govaerts treated five of these eight names as a fourth species, Arthrophyllum balansae. Lowry and Plunkett (2010) split Arthrophyllum balansae, transferring four of these names to Polyscias as part of Polyscias vieillardii. The fifth name, Arthrophyllum grandifolium, was transferred to Polyscias as Polyscias mackeei.

The only other change of species circumscription by Lowry and Plunkett (2010) was the splitting of Polyscias australiana. They raised one of its subspecies to the rank of species as Polyscias disperma.

References

Sources 
Gregory M. Plunkett, Jun Wen, Porter P. Lowry II, Murray J. Henwood, Pedro Fiaschi, and Anthony D. Mitchell. accepted, undated. Araliaceae, pages ??. In: Klaus Kubitzki (editor); ?? (volume editor). The Families and Genera of Vascular Plants volume ??. Springer-Verlag: Berlin; Heidelberg, Germany. ISBN ??

External links 
 Lowry & Plunkett.2010  Hawaii Barcoding  University of Hawaii at Hilo
 World Checklist and Bibliography of Araliaceae  World Checklists  kewbooks  Scientific Publications  Kew Gardens
 Arthrophyllum  Mabberley's Plant-Book
 Grotefendia  Palmervandenbroekia  Index Nominum Genericorum  References  NMNH Department of Botany  Research and Collections  Smithsonian National Museum of Natural History
 Arthrophyllum  Grotefendia  Palmervandenbroekia  Plant Names  IPNI
 Arthrophyllum And Grotefendia And Palmervandenbroekia At: Names At: Tropicos At: Science and Conservation At: Missouri Botanical Garden
 Arthrophyllum, page 878  parts 13-17  Bijdragen tot de flora van Nederlandsch Indië  Blume, Karl Ludwig, 1796-1862  B  Authors  BHL
 CRC World Dictionary of Plant Names: A-C At: Botany & Plant Science At: Life Science At: CRC Press
 Flora Malesiana home page
 Arthrophyllum At: List of Genera At: Araliaceae At: List of families At: Families and Genera in GRIN At: Queries At: GRIN taxonomy for plants
 subgenus Arthrophyllum  Polyscias  Araliaceae  Apiineae  Apiales In: ··· Embryophyta At: Streptophytina At: Streptophyta At: Viridiplantae At: Eukaryota At: Taxonomy At: UniProt

 
Apiales genera
Historically recognized angiosperm genera
Polyscias